Oslavskoye is a rural locality (a selo) in Bogolyubovskoye Rural Settlement, Suzdalsky District, Vladimir Oblast, Russia. The population was 336 as of 2010. There are 36 streets.

Geography 
Oslavskoye is located on the right bank of the Nerl River, 39 km southeast of Suzdal (the district's administrative centre) by road. Novoye is the nearest rural locality.

References 

Rural localities in Suzdalsky District
Vladimirsky Uyezd